Kiengthavesak Xayxanapanya (born 14 March 1999) is a Laotian footballer currently playing as a defender for FC Chanthabouly in the Lao League.

He started his career with Lao Police Club then went ahead to sign up for Young Elephants where he played just one match. He was signed by Master 7 the following season and made his debut in the matchday 1 fixture against Lao Toyota which he scored. 
As a Laotian International, he was part of the Laos U23 team at the 2018 Asian Games where he played all group stage matches. He has also played thrice for the Laos national football team.

Club

International

References

1999 births
Living people
Laotian footballers
Laos international footballers
Association football defenders
Master 7 FC players